Given a unital C*-algebra , a *-closed subspace S containing 1 is called an operator system. One can associate to each subspace  of a unital C*-algebra an operator system via .

The appropriate morphisms between operator systems are completely positive maps.

By a theorem of Choi and Effros, operator systems can be characterized as *-vector spaces equipped with an Archimedean matrix order.

See also

 Operator space

References

Operator theory
Operator algebras